The Roman Catholic Diocese of Oyo) is a Latin suffragan diocese in the Ecclesiastical province of Ibadan, Nigeria. It still depends on the missionary Roman Congregation for the Evangelization of Peoples.

History 
The Apostolic Prefecture of Oyo was erected on territory split from the Apostolic Vicariate of Lagos on March 3, 1949. On January 18, 1963 it was promoted to the Diocese of Oyo, with the Archdiocese of Ibadan as its Metropolitan. On March 3, 1995, portions of the Diocese were removed to the Diocese of Osgobo.

Special churches 
The bishops' seat is Oyo Cathedral, otherwise the cathedral of Our Lady of the Assumption in Oyo.

Statistics 
In 2014, it pastorally served 36,542 Roman Catholics (1.7% of the population) in a 18,000km2 (6,900 sq mi) area, mostly Muslim. It has 28 parishes and 3 missions with 51 priests (48 diocesan, 3 religious), 44 lay religious (3 brothers, 41 sisters) and 17 seminarians. As of 2004, it consisted of 26 parishes served by 47 priests and 43 religious.

Bishops
(all Roman Rite)
Apostolic Prefect of Oyo

 Father Owen McCoy, White Fathers (M. Afr.) (1 April 1949 – 18 January 1963 see below ↓)
Suffragan Bishops of Oyo
 Owen McCoy, M. Afr. (↑ see above 18 January 1963 – retired 12 April 1973)
 Julius Babatunde Adelakun (13 April 1973 – retired 4 November 2009); previously Auxiliary Bishop of Oyo and Titular Bishop of Thunigaba (16 November 1972 – 13 April 1973)
 Emmanuel Adetoyese Badejo (4 November 2009 – ), succeeding as former Coadjutor Bishop of Oyo (14 August 2007 – 4 November 2009)

Coadjutor Bishop
Emmanuel Adetoyese Badejo (2007-2009)

Auxiliary Bishops
Julius Babatunde Adelakun (1972-1973), appointed Bishop
Anthony Olubunmi Okogie (1971-1972), appointed auxiliary bishop of Lagos; future Cardinal

Other priests of this diocese who became bishops
Gabriel ’Leke Abegunrin, appointed Bishop of Osogbo in 1995
Francis Obafemi Adesina (priest, 1989-1995), appointed Bishop of Ijebu-Ode in 2019
Paul Adegboyega Olawoore, appointed Coadjutor Bishop of Ilorin in 2018
John Akinkunmi Oyejola, appointed Bishop of Osogbo in 2016

See also 
 Roman Catholicism in Nigeria

References

External links and sources
 GCatholic.org
 Catholic Hierarchy

Roman Catholic dioceses in Nigeria
Christian organizations established in 1949
Roman Catholic dioceses and prelatures established in the 20th century
1949 establishments in Nigeria
Roman Catholic Ecclesiastical Province of Ibadan